Barnabas S. Potter (February 3, 1836 – September 23, 1908) was a member of the Wisconsin State Assembly, and Mayor of West Bend, Wisconsin

Biography
Potter was born on February 3, 1836, in Elba, New York, the son of Jonathan Potter and Julia Anna Potter. He moved to West Bend, Wisconsin in 1856. He married Hermina S. Bourgeois in 1868. Potter became mayor of West Bend on April 21, 1887 He died of kidney and liver trouble at his home in West Bend in 1908.

Career
Potter was elected to the Assembly in 1902. He was a Democrat.

References

External links

The Political Graveyard

People from Genesee County, New York
People from West Bend, Wisconsin
Democratic Party members of the Wisconsin State Assembly
Businesspeople from Wisconsin
1836 births
1908 deaths
Burials in Wisconsin
19th-century American politicians
19th-century American businesspeople